Retinaculum of foot may refer to

 Flexor retinaculum of foot
 Peroneal retinacula
 Superior extensor retinaculum of foot
 Inferior extensor retinaculum of foot